Imre Németh (born 14 April 1955) is a Hungarian agrarian engineer and politician, who served as Minister of Agriculture and Rural Development between 2002 and 2005. In the second cabinet of Ferenc Gyurcsány he served as state secretary of the Prime Minister's Office from 2007 to 2008.

References

 Bölöny, József – Hubai, László: Magyarország kormányai 1848–2004 [Cabinets of Hungary 1848–2004], Akadémiai Kiadó, Budapest, 2004 (5th edition).
 Zsigmond Király Főiskola - Jelenkutató Csoport

1955 births
Living people
People from Vas County
Agriculture ministers of Hungary
Members of the National Assembly of Hungary (1998–2002)
Members of the National Assembly of Hungary (2002–2006)
People from Vasvár